Mark Bathum (born October 1, 1958) is an American Paralympic alpine skier. He has competed at two Winter Paralympics, two World Cups and two World Championships.

Personal history 
Mark Bathum was born on October 1, 1958, in Seattle, Washington. He was then brought up in Seattle. At age 9, he began skiing, and three years later, at 12, began ski racing.

Bathum graduated from Mercer Island High School in 1977, the University of Washington in 1981 (Finance and Marketing) and earned an MBA from UCLA in 1986.

References 

1958 births
Living people
Paralympic silver medalists for the United States
Paralympic alpine skiers of the United States
University of Washington Foster School of Business alumni
UCLA Anderson School of Management alumni
American male alpine skiers
Alpine skiers at the 2014 Winter Paralympics
Alpine skiers at the 2018 Winter Paralympics
Mercer Island High School alumni
Medalists at the 2010 Winter Paralympics
Medalists at the 2014 Winter Paralympics
Paralympic medalists in alpine skiing